This is a chronological list of the production discography of American musician and record producer Kurt Ballou, and doubles as a list of recordings made at GodCity Studio.

1990s

2000s

2010s

2020s

References 

Production discographies
Discographies of American artists
Punk rock discographies
Heavy metal discographies